This is a list of artists and people who were either part of or linked to the New Romantic scene of the late 1970s and early 80s. This list does not include little-known local bands or individuals. Bands are listed by the first letter in their name (not including articles such as "a", "an", or "the"). Individuals are listed by last name.

See also Blitz Kids.

B
 Berlin Blondes
 Boy George

C
 Classix Nouveaux

D
Duran Duran

E
 Endgames

M
Marilyn
The Mood

P
 Princess Julia

S
Philip Sallon
Spandau Ballet
Steve Strange

T
 Techno Twins

V
 Visage

References

Youth culture in the United Kingdom
Subcultures
New Romantics